Dioscorea pentaphylla is a species of flowering plant in the yam family known by the common name fiveleaf yam. It is native to southern and eastern Asia (China, India, Indochina, Indonesia, Philippines, etc.) as well as New Guinea and northern Australia. It is widely cultivated as a food crop and naturalized in Cuba and on several island chains in the Pacific (including Hawaii).

Dioscorea pentaphylla  is a prickly vine that twines counterclockwise around objects and other plants. It may reach 10 meters in length. The alternately arranged leaves are compound, divided into 3 to 5 leaflets each up to 10 centimeters long. The plant produces horseshoe-shaped bulbils about a centimeter long. New plants can sprout from the bulbils. Flowers are borne in spikes. The vine grows from a tuber. Specimens may weigh 3 pounds and may be located over a meter underground.

The tubers of the vine can be cooked and eaten.

References

External links
USDA Plants Profile

pentaphylla
Plants described in 1753
Taxa named by Carl Linnaeus
Flora of Asia
Flora of New Guinea
Flora of Australia
Edible plants